Guildford Spectrum is a leisure complex in Guildford, Surrey, England. Owned by Guildford Borough Council, it was opened on 23 February 1993 at a cost of £28 million. It is the home of ice hockey teams the Guildford Flames and the Guildford Phoenix, Aldwych Speed Club (short track speed skating) and other sports clubs. In addition to its large indoor sports arena, it has an Olympic size ice rink, three swimming pools and a high diving pool, a tenpin bowling centre, squash courts and a football/athletics stadium.

The stadium adjoining the complex has 135 seats under cover as well as having a standing capacity of around one thousand.

In 2011, operation of Spectrum was outsourced to Freedom Leisure as part of a ten-year deal with Guildford Borough Council.

See also

Guildford Flames
Guildford City FC
Guildford Lightning

References

External links

Freedom Leisure
Guildford Spectrum official website
Guildford City FC official website
Guildford International VC official website
Aldwych Speed Skating Club official website

Buildings and structures completed in 1993
Sports venues in Guildford
Basketball venues in England
Indoor ice hockey venues in England
Buildings and structures in Guildford
Indoor arenas in England
Sports venues completed in 1993
1993 establishments in England
Netball venues in England